Kadhim Hussein Abdullah (born 30 November 1977) is an Iraqi former footballer who played as a midfielder. He represented the Iraq national team at the 2000 WAFF Championship.

References

External links
 

1977 births
Place of birth unknown
Living people
Iraqi footballers
Association football midfielders
Iraqi Premier League players
Al-Quwa Al-Jawiya players
Najaf FC players
Iraqi expatriate footballers
Expatriate footballers in Bahrain
Iraqi expatriate sportspeople in Bahrain
Busaiteen Club players
Bahraini Premier League players
Iraq international footballers